Schimatari is a town and a former municipality in Boeotia, Greece. Since the 2011 local government reform it is part of the municipality Tanagra, of which it is the seat and a municipal unit. The municipal unit has an area of 38.285 km2. Population 7,173 (2011). It is situated in the wide valley of the river Asopos, at 6 km from the South Euboean Gulf coast. The Motorway 1 (Athens - Lamia - Thessaloniki) passes north of Schimatari. Schimatari is located 13 km south of Chalcis, 23 km east of Thebes and 43 km north-northwest of Athens. The Tanagra Airport lies to the south.

An agricultural settlement until the 1980s, its proximity to Athens has led to a significant growth in industrial activities and population.

Subdivisions
The municipal unit Schimatari consists of one single community Schimatari, which contains the villages Oinoi, Plaka Dilesi and Schimatari.

Population

Twin cities
 Pozzoleone, Italy
 Ennistymon, Ireland

See also
List of settlements in Boeotia

External links
 Schimatari on the GTP Travel Pages

References

Populated places in Boeotia